Megaraneus is a genus of African orb-weaver spiders containing the single species, Megaraneus gabonensis. It was first described by R. F. Lawrence in 1968, to contain the single species originally published under the name Epeira gabonensis.

References

Araneidae
Monotypic Araneomorphae genera
Spiders of Africa